Hemimycena cephalotricha is a species of basidiomycete fungus of the family Mycenaceae, of the order Agaricales.

It is native to the southwest of Western Australia.

References

External links 

 Species Fungorum

Mycenaceae
Fungi described in 1982
Fungi of Australia